William Hamilton  (1751–1801) was an English painter and illustrator.

Life
Hamilton was born in Chelsea, London, but travelled and worked in Italy with Antonio Zucchi for several years. He trained first as an architectural draftsman, but soon moved to theatrical portraits and scenes from plays.

Hamilton became an associate member of the Royal Academy from 1784, and was made a full member in 1789.

Works
Hamilton became very well known for his paintings depicting episodes from the plays of Shakespeare and for his illustrations of poems. He was commissioned to create works for John Boydell's Shakespeare Gallery, Thomas Macklin's Bible and Robert Bowyer's English History. These were widely reproduced in popular prints. Francesco Bartolozzi engraved a number of Hamilton's best known works.

He also painted modern events, such as the execution of Marie Antoinette, in the manner of epic historical drama. Several battle scenes were also exhibited including The destruction of the Spanish battery ships before Gibraltar in the night of the 13th of Sept. last (1783) and Defence of the Breach at Jean d'Acre by Sir Sidney Smith (1800).

Hamilton's style shows the influence of the cult of sentiment typical of the period, resembling the work of Angelica Kauffman. He also sometimes adopts aspects of Fuseli's dramatic distortions in composition and figure drawing.

Gallery

References

External links

 

1751 births
1801 deaths
18th-century English painters
English male painters
Royal Academicians
18th-century English male artists